Francesco Fossi (born 15 April 1988) is an Italian rower. He competed in the Men's quadruple sculls event at the 2012 Summer Olympics and the men's double sculls at the 2016 Summer Olympics.  In the latter event, he finished fourth with teammate Romano Battisti.

He has also won a silver medal in the men's double sculls, again with Battisti, at the 2014 World Rowing Championships.  The previous year, the pair had won a bronze in the same event.  The pair also won the European title in 2013.  Fossi was also part of the Italian team that won bronze in the men's quadruple sculls at the 2011 European Championships.

References

External links
 

Italian male rowers
Olympic rowers of Italy
Rowers at the 2012 Summer Olympics
Rowers at the 2016 Summer Olympics
Sportspeople from Florence
1988 births
Living people

World Rowing Championships medalists for Italy
Mediterranean Games gold medalists for Italy
Mediterranean Games medalists in rowing
Competitors at the 2013 Mediterranean Games
European Rowing Championships medalists